Józef Mieses (1882-1941 or 1942) was a Polish teacher, linguist, rabbi and military officer.

He reached the rank of colonel and chief rabbi in the Polish Army, where from 1921 to 1932 he worked in the Polish Ministry of Defense as the Chief of the Judaism Department. He published several works related to linguistics and was a recipient of the Polish Cross of Merit. He is presumed to have died during the Nazi occupation of Poland, most likely in 1942.

References

Further reading
 Rocznik Oficerski 1924, Ministerstwo Spraw Wojskowych, Oddział V Sztabu Generalnego Wojska Polskiego, Warszawa 1924, p. 31, 1299.
 Rocznik Oficerski 1928, Ministerstwo Spraw Wojskowych, Warszawa 1928, p. 843.

External links
 Photograph from NAC archive: 

1882 births
1940s deaths
Year of death uncertain
Polish military chaplains
Polish Army officers
Linguists from Poland
20th-century Polish rabbis
Military personnel who died in the Holocaust
Jewish educators
Rabbis in the military
20th-century linguists
Polish Jews who died in the Holocaust